Llangwm is a small rural village and former community, now in the community of Llantrisant Fawr, in Monmouthshire, south east Wales. In 2022 the community was abolished and merged with Llantrisant Fawr.

History and amenities

Church of St. Jerome

Llangwm Uchaf is best known for the Church of St. Jerome.  The oldest parts of the church date from the 12th century, built in the Early English style. The church was partly rebuilt by J. P. Seddon in the 1860s.

The church contains a remarkable medieval rood screen and rood loft, restored during Seddon's 19th-century reconstruction. It has been described as a breathtaking sight, rising almost to the roof  and one of the most spectacular rood screens in south Wales. It has been suggested that the village's remoteness saved the screen from destruction by the Puritans.

An ancient structure ornamented with trellis-work, possibly a stoup, a lamp or a piscina, was found built into the wall during restoration. Three "Green Men" with foliage issuing from their mouths are carved in the chancel arch.

He was inspired to become an Independent by fellow church Dissenter William Wroth.

Swansea University historian Dr Alun Withey has examined in some detail a 1671 dispute over the church seating arrangements. He reports that the village was ablaze, with divers[e] variances, quarrels and debates even lawsuits, to the utter destruction and overthrow of manie. It was left to the churchwarden, respected local yeoman farmer John Gwin, to settle matters. Gwin's notebook containing his seating plan still survives, giving us, Withey argues, a rare insight into the world of parochial life in 17th-century Wales, and thus contributes greatly to our general understanding of Welsh history.

The church is a Grade I listed building. It has been declared redundant and is in the care of the Friends of Friendless Churches. It was repaired in 2013–2014.

Church of St. John
The parish has a smaller second church, that of St. John at Llangwm Isaf. This church is located on the route to the Church of St. Jerome and is also in the Early English style, restored in the 19th century.

Baptist chapel
The Baptist chapel, situated at the south west end of the village, was built in 1840 on land given by Cradock Gwynne Watkins of the village. The building was financed by the local Baptists who, at that time, attended "Peniel", an older (now ruined) chapel on Golden Hill of which the chapel at Llangwm was a branch.

The exterior is cement rendered with a slate roof. There are three windows, with tracery on each side wall. A date-stone for 1840 is set above a tall pointed door entrance. The interior has a gallery at the entrance end and late-19th-century pews. The walls are finished in plain two-tone and the pulpit has a plain balustraded rail around. There is seating for approximately 100 persons.

The chapel, which is mentioned in Sir Joseph Bradney's A History of Monmouthshire (1923), was designated a Grade II listed building on 12 October 2000.

Gaer Fawr hill fort

Allt-y-Bela

Allt-y-Bela is a mid-15th century house in Llangwm Uchaf. It is a Grade II* listed building.

Allt-y-Bela was built as a hall house in the mid-15th century, originally as a traditional, single-storey, cruck-frame building with wooden mullions and leaded lights. About a century later a first floor was added with dormer windows and chimneys. In 1599 the wealthy Midlands wool merchant Roger Edwards, the founder of Usk Grammar School, added a three-storey Renaissance tower.

Visiting in the late 1940s, when the owner was farmer Mr Moseley, the local writer and historian Fred Hando noted the builder's inscription mark – 1599, E.R. R.E – and was also shown the central spiral staircase, built around a massive single tree-trunk newel post. Curiously the stair treads showed holes through which bell-ropes would once have passed and there was a tiny bellcote, with a bellframe, at the very top of the tower. The bell had reputedly been moved to the nearby church of St David's Church, Llangeview. The Edwards family was part of an extreme religious sect and it has been suggested that the bell would have been used to call members to services.

By 1980 one side of the tower had fallen and by 2000 the house was described as "now miserably derelict". After years of neglect the property was the subject of a compulsory purchase order, with no compensation, by Monmouthshire County Council and in 2001 the council handed it to the preservation body the Spitalfields Historic Buildings Trust. The Trust secured a £300,000 grant from Cadw, borrowed the same amount from the Architectural Heritage Fund, and also planned to spend £400,000 of its own funds on the restoration.

The name Allt-y-Bela derives from the Welsh, meaning "wooded heights or cliff of the wolf." Today the property is run as a bed and breakfast guest house.

Notes

References

External links
 Llangwm and District Community Website
 Geograph photos of Llangwm
 Old photos of the village by Francis Frith
 "Llangwm Uchaf" at cistercian-way.newport.ac.uk
 Llangwm at genuki.org

Villages in Monmouthshire
Former communities in Monmouthshire